Felling is the process of cutting down trees, an element of the task of logging. The person cutting the trees is a feller.  A feller buncher is a machine capable of felling a single large tree or grouping and felling several small ones simultaneously.

Methods

Hand felling
In hand felling, an axe, saw, or chainsaw is used to fell a tree, followed up by limbing and bucking in traditional applications. In the modern commercial logging industry, felling is typically followed by limbing and skidding.

Feller buncher

A feller-buncher is a motorized vehicle with an attachment which rapidly cuts and gathers several trees in the process of felling them.

In cut-to-length logging a harvester performs the tasks of a feller-buncher, additionally doing the delimbing and bucking. When harvesting wood from a felled tree, the recommended methods should be followed in order to maximize wood recovery. The suggested trend is to make deeper cuts and smaller openness when performing undercuts.

Types of cut 

The undercut or notch cut is the guiding or aiming slot for the tree and is a V-shaped notch placed on the side of the tree in the direction of intended fall.

The back cut or felling cut is made on the opposite side of the tree of the undercut and is cut through the 
base of the tree severing the “hinge” holding the tree up.

Boom-corridor experiment 
This was an experiment conducted regarding felling trees and the continuous felling of trees in boom-corridors which might lead to an increase in harvester productivity. An efficient way to do this would be to use felling heads which would increase efficiency and fall time.

Gallery

References

Logging
Lumberjack sports